Where Eskimos Live (AKA Tam, gdzie żyją Eskimosi) is a feature film released in 2002. It was a Polish-American-British and Germany co-operation.

Sharkey, posing as a UNICEF rescuer of war orphans but really part of the sinister world of child trafficking, picks up Vlado, an orphan of war dreaming of freedom and a better life. They embark upon a strange and enlightening journey through war-torn Bosnia. As they struggle to leave the country and fight to stay alive, they discover love and compassion from which emerges moral and spiritual redemption.

Cast
 Bob Hoskins as Sharkey
 Sergiusz Żymełka as Vlado
 Krzysztof Majchrzak as Colonel Vuko
 Marcin Dorociński as musician on christenings
 Przemysław Sadowski as deserter
 Katarzyna Bargiełowska as crying woman
 Mirosław Baka as principal
 Szymon Bobrowski as physician
 Jarosław Boberek as truck driver
 Marek Kasprzyk as head of the Russian mafia
 Tomasz Dedek as member of the Russian mafia
 Bronisław Pawlik as old man in the library
 Piotr Grabowski as soldier 
 Dariusz Malesza as boy with gang
 Andrzej Chyra as lawyer
 Miraj Grbić as an additional actor

External links
 

German war drama films
English-language German films
English-language Polish films
2002 films
2002 drama films
Bosnian War films
American war drama films
British war drama films
Yugoslav Wars in fiction
2000s war drama films
Polish war drama films
2000s English-language films
2000s American films
2000s British films
2000s German films